Kathryn Beare (November 7, 1917 – January 27, 1997) was a catcher who played in the All-American Girls Professional Baseball League. Listed at 5' 7", 170 lb., she batted and threw right handed.

Born in Syracuse, New York, the stocky Katie Beare played with the Fort Wayne Daisies in part of the 1946 season, batting a .111 average in 24 games while sharing catching duties with Kathryn Vonderau.

Following her brief stint in the league she returned to Syracuse, where she played softball for many years.

In 1988, Beare received further recognition when she became part of Women in Baseball, a permanent display based at the Baseball Hall of Fame and Museum in Cooperstown, New York, which was unveiled to honor the entire All-American Girls Professional Baseball League.

Career statistics
Batting 

Fielding

Sources

1917 births
1997 deaths
Baseball catchers
All-American Girls Professional Baseball League players
Fort Wayne Daisies players
Sportspeople from Syracuse, New York
Softball players from New York (state)
20th-century American women
20th-century American people